Impasugong, officially the Municipality of Impasugong (Binukid and Higaonon: Bánuwa ta Impasug-ung;), is a 1st class municipality in the province of Bukidnon, Philippines. According to the 2020 census, it has a population of 53,863 people.

It is also spelled Impasug-ong.

Impasug-ong also has a tree park, 15 minutes drive from the centre. The town's communal ranch which has a 642-hectare land area is the only communal ranch solely owned by the government throughout the Philippines.

Geography

Impasugong is strategically located in the north-eastern part of the Province of Bukidnon.

With a total number of 13 barangays, it is characterized by mountains, deep canyons and gorges. The terrain is predominantly rugged with a significant slope of 18% and above covering 72% of the land area and distributed throughout the municipality.

Land area and use

Rivers
Pulangi River, the major source of the Rio Grande de Mindanao river system and also the longest river in bukidnon
Dampilasan River, first of tributary of Pulangi River
Atugan River, Main river in the municipality that passes along the Poblacion.
Tagoloan River, A major River whose mouth is in Misamis Oriental
Kalabugao River, It is a tributary of Pulangi river in Bukidnon

Climate

It is a typhoon-free area ideal for the production of high value crops. Average temperature ranges from  throughout the year.

Barangays
Impasugong is politically subdivided into 13 barangays.

Demographics

Economy

Major crops

The major crops grown by farmers in the municipality are: corn, pineapple, rice, coffee, sugarcane, banana, vegetables (mostly temperate types like lettuce, broccoli, cabbage), abacá, fruits and legumes.

Livestock

There are 9 commercial cattle farms in the area holding 1,143 heads in all. The LGU also manages a communal ranch in a 649-hectare land that holds 300 heads of cattle. This supports the dispersal and breed improvement program of the municipality.

There are also 28 commercial poultry breeder farms in the municipality with an estimated combined population of 775,000 heads.

Ecotourism
CEDAR or Center for Ecological Development and Recreation, situated beside the highway in barangay Impalutao, is the main entity backed by the Local Government Unit of Bukidnon and DENR (Department of Environment and Natural Resources) to promote eco-tourism in the province. It has a total land area of about 1,703 hectares. 373 hectares is covered by the man-made and natural forest. It has an elevation of 600 to 1200 meters above sea level with Mount Kibuwa as the highest. A 100-hectare rattan plantation exists in the area. The CEDAR was developed because of the reforestation efforts of the government of Bukidnon. Now dubbed as “An Eco-tourism Site in the Heart of Bukidnon”, it was declared as a protected area and was managed by the government since 1912. It is equipped with man-made swimming pool, sourcing from the natural springs surrounding the area and has five major waterfalls with three being the most accessible.

References

External links

 [ Philippine Standard Geographic Code]
Philippine Census Information
 

Municipalities of Bukidnon
Populated places on the Rio Grande de Mindanao